TBC1 domain family, member 24 is a protein that in humans is encoded by the TBC1D24 gene.

Function 

This gene encodes a protein with a conserved domain, referred to as the TBC domain, characteristic of proteins which interact with GTPases. TBC domain proteins may serve as GTPase-activating proteins for a particular group of GTPases, the Rab (Ras-related proteins in brain) small GTPases which are involved in the regulation of membrane trafficking. Mutations in this gene are associated with familial infantile myoclonic epilepsy. Alternative splicing results in multiple transcript variants.

Mutations in TBC1D24 cause Hereditary hearing loss.

References

Further reading